The Minister responsible for the Canadian Wheat Board is the member of the Canadian Cabinet who has the responsibility of supervising and setting policy for the Canadian Wheat Board and appointing the government representatives who sit on the body.  

Canadian Wheat Board
Wheat production in Canada